Pengiran Sallehuddin bin Pengiran Haji Damit (born 5 November 1973) is a Bruneian retired footballer who is a coach for Kasuka FC. One of the legends of Bruneian football, he most notably played for the Brunei M-League representative team that won the 1999 Malaysia Cup, which is regarded as Brunei football's greatest achievement. He also played professionally for Brunei DPMM FC for several seasons.

Prior to his marriage in 2001, his given name was Awangku Sallehuddin due to naming rules for descendants of Bruneian royalty.

Club career

Early career
Sallehuddin began his sporting career playing tennis under a government scheme, representing Brunei at the Davis Cup in 1994 and 1995. It was around this time that he also made his football debut in the Malaysia Premier League, appearing for the Brunei representative team.

Towards the turn of the century Sallehuddin found more playing time in expense of the ageing Martilu Mohamed on the left side of a back three, a formation favoured by David Booth and his successor Mick Jones. He started the 1999 Malaysia Cup final alongside captain and fellow legend Liew Chuan Fue and first-season debutant Norsillmy Taha and claimed a 2-1 victory in Kuala Lumpur through two goals by Rosli Liman.

Sallehuddin inherited the captain's armband from Liew and stayed with Brunei as the severely-depleted team were immediately relegated to Premier Two, managing only two wins and conceding the most goals (53). He stayed with Brunei in the second tier of Malaysian football until 2005.

DPMM
Sallehuddin played with local club AH United in the B-League (winning the 2005-06 FA Cup) until the middle of 2006 when he transferred to Brunei DPMM FC who were playing in the Malaysia Premier League for the first time after replacing Sallehuddin's own former team, Brunei. They achieved promotion to the 2006-07 Malaysia Super League that season and then astoundingly finished third in Malaysia's top tier thanks to goals from topscoring Shahrazen Said.

DPMM moved to the Singaporean S.League in 2009, after the deregistration of the Brunei Football Association (BAFA) by the Registrar of Societies prompted the Football Association of Malaysia to exempt DPMM from the Super League. Sallehuddin was appointed captain and won the Singapore League Cup of that year, despite being suspended in the final. After an incident in the 39th minute in the game against Home United on 2 August, he was given a one-year ban by the Football Association of Singapore for bringing the game into disrepute. A month later, FIFA suspended Brunei which meant that DPMM could no longer play in the S.League. With only five matches to go, all of DPMM's results were expunged from record.

Sallehuddin returned to AH United on loan in the 2010 Brunei Premier League 1, then AM Gunners for the short-lived 2011 season. Recalled to his parent club after their re-entry into the S.League in 2012, the 39-year-old was still being relied on by coach Vjeran Simunic. Sallehuddin won the League Cup and finished second in the league behind Tampines Rovers in 2012, but after a disappointing 2013 campaign, he was released in the close season.

Kota Ranger

After a year without league football, Sallehuddin lined up one last time alongside Norsillmy Taha at Kota Ranger FC in the 2015 Brunei Premier League. He helped his team go top of the table and win promotion to the 2016 Brunei Super League.

Kasuka 
Since 2017, Sallehuddin works as a coach for Kasuka FC, while also registered as a player despite well being in his forties. (He had said that he plans to retire from football only after the age of 45.)

On 12 April 2019, Sallehuddin scored on the 44th minute against Najip FC in an 8–1 victory at the 2018–19 Brunei Super League. This makes him the oldest scorer in the history of the Brunei leagues, at the age of 45 years, 5 months and 7 days.

International career
Sallehuddin played three games for the national team at the 20th SEA Games held in Brunei, scoring the third goal in the first game against Cambodia in a 3-3 draw. His next two international tournaments were the 2000 AFC Asian Cup qualifying and the 2002 World Cup qualifying, both were disastrous campaigns where Brunei scored no goals and conceded 39. 

Sallehuddin went with a team composed largely of QAF FC players for the 2006 AFC Challenge Cup held in Bangladesh, Brunei failed to advance from the group stage courtesy of goal difference. His final appearances for the national team were at the 2008 AFF Suzuki Cup qualifying held in Cambodia where he scored a penalty in the 76th minute against Timor-Leste in their only win from 4 games.

Honours

Team
Brunei M-League representative team
 Malaysia Cup: 1999
AH United
 Brunei FA Cup: 2005–06
Brunei DPMM FC
 Singapore League Cup (2): 2009, 2012
Kota Ranger FC
 Brunei Premier League: 2015

Individual
 
  Meritorius Service Medal (PJK) (1999)

External links

References 

1973 births
Living people
Association football defenders
Bruneian footballers
Brunei international footballers
DPMM FC players
Brunei (Malaysia Premier League team) players
Competitors at the 1999 Southeast Asian Games
Male tennis players
Southeast Asian Games competitors for Brunei